The Treaty of El Pardo was signed on 12 February 1761 between representatives of the Spanish and Portuguese empires.

Based on the terms of the treaty, all aspects of the Treaty of Madrid in 1750 were repealed. The reasons for this were the difficulties encountered in the 1750s to establish a clear border between the Spanish and Portuguese new South American possessions in such an enormous undeveloped area.

After both the Guarani War of 1756 and the accession to the throne of King Charles III of Spain in 1759,  the Spanish king had decided that a general revision of the treaties made with Portugal was necessary.

See also
List of treaties

External links

Dividing the Spoils: Portugal and Spain in South America

1761 treaties
El Pardo
El Pardo
Portuguese colonization of the Americas
Spanish colonization of the Americas
Portugal–Spain relations
Geopolitical rivalry
1761 in Portugal
1761 in South America
1761 in Spain
1761 in the Spanish Empire